A surprise album or surprise release refers to the release of an album with little or no prior announcement, marketing or promotion. The strategy contrasts traditional album releases, which typically feature weeks or months of advertising in the form of singles, music videos, tour announcements and album pre-sales. Often, the release of a surprise album is the formal announcement of its release. This strategy developed in part due to the prevalence of album leaks on the Internet during the 2000s and became popular by the mid-2010s among high-profile recording acts.

History

Precursors 

English rock artist David Bowie's studio album Toy, intended for release in March 2001, was originally conceived with the intention of being recorded and released as quickly as possible, foregoing traditional promotional cycles in the process. While the album was ultimately shelved, not seeing an official release until 2021, the concept was regarded by analysts as an early precursor to the surprise album model.

The English rock band Radiohead's 2007 studio album In Rainbows is often credited as the first surprise album. The release was announced on the band's blog ten days prior, which DIY magazine describes as "a pretty unexpected move" at the time. Shortly after the release, Radiohead's bassist Colin Greenwood stated the band had several motivations behind the album's release format, including the increased popularity of the internet as a tool for discovering music, frustrations with the traditional release and promotion format, the freedom of not being signed to a record label at the time, a desire to do something special and unique, and an interest in broadcasting their music directly to listeners globally at the same time. It also served as a countermeasure to Internet leaks of albums, which had become prevalent at the time. In Rainbows is also credited for starting the pay-what-you-want model.

After ending a tumultuous relationship with Interscope Records in 2007, Nine Inch Nails independently released Ghosts I–IV and The Slip in 2008. Both were released for free (with the option to purchase higher-quality digital or physical editions) and were released under a Creative Commons license to allow fans the ability to edit and remix the new music as they desired. Nine Inch Nails manager Jim Guerinot said the idea to release the albums without prior announcement was to pre-empt a leak and control the marketing, stating: "Internet searches peak around the leak, not around the single or the album. By the time the album comes out, it's done."

In 2011, American rappers Jay-Z and Kanye West advertised false release dates for their collaborative album Watch the Throne, in part an effort to pre-empt leaks. This strategy inspired the singer Frank Ocean to surprise-release his first album Channel Orange one week earlier than its publicized release date.

Popularization 
Between 2011 and 2012, David Bowie recorded The Next Day in complete secrecy, requiring personnel involved to sign non-disclosure agreements. At the time, the public was convinced that Bowie had effectively retired. On 8 January 2013, his 66th birthday, the music video for "Where Are We Now?" was uploaded to YouTube in the early hours of the morning, with his website announcing that listeners could buy the single on iTunes and pre-order The Next Day. Within a couple of hours, Bowie made headlines around the world. The single peaked at number six on the UK Singles Chart, becoming Bowie's highest-charting single since 1985's "Absolute Beginners". Upon release in March 2013, The Next Day debuted at number one on the UK Albums Chart and number two on the US Billboard 200.

Beyoncé is often credited with the popularization of the surprise release strategy. Following the leak of her previous album 4 one month before its scheduled release date, Beyoncé began working on her next album in secrecy to prevent a repeat. She shared details of the album only with a small circle of people and often shifted the release date, which was only finalized a week before its release. The album was kept a complete secret from the general public until the moment it was released. Eponymously titled Beyoncé, the album was uploaded exclusively to the iTunes Store on December 13, 2013, just after midnight in the United States and became the fastest-selling album in history of the iTunes Store within three days of its release. The commercial success of the album was a factor in shifting the global release date for all albums to Friday. Beyoncé later explained that her intent was to reinstate the idea of an album release as a significant, exciting event that had lost meaning in the face of hype created around singles. Harley Brown of Vulture wrote, "Ever since Beyoncé's self-titled visual album appeared like a Christmas miracle on the iTunes store at midnight on a Thursday in December of 2013, the rules for how to release a record were rewritten literally overnight." According to Vulture writer Lindsey Zoladz, the release was made possible by, "presumably, an entire rain forest's worth of nondisclosure agreements". The singer would also adapt the release format for her follow-up album Lemonade in 2016. Jay-Z surprise released his 2017 album 4:44, and the following year the couple surprise released the collaborative album Everything Is Love as The Carters.

By the mid-2010s, the music industry had entered what Zoladz called the "surprise-album era". While Beyoncé's name became synonymous with surprise albums, subsequent acts used the strategy in different ways. For instance, certain artists unexpectedly released an album, or a selection of tracks, that had been announced at an earlier date in an effort to outpace Internet leaks, as in 2015 with Björk's Vulnicura, Madonna's Rebel Heart, and Kendrick Lamar's To Pimp a Butterfly.

Further examples

Some surprise albums created controversy. In 2014, Irish rock band U2 partnered with Apple Inc. to release their thirteenth studio album Songs of Innocence through the iTunes Store at no cost to half a billion people. The album was automatically added to users' music libraries in iTunes, which for those with automatic downloads enabled, resulted in an unprompted download of the album to their electronic devices. Many users did not want the album and several months after the release were frustrated that they could not delete the album from their devices. David Sackllah of Consequence of Sound noted that "U2 and Apple deserve credit for thinking ambitiously, but they overestimated the band's relevance with fans, and many felt like the automatic download constituted an invasion of privacy."

In 2016, American R&B singer Frank Ocean surprised released his visual album Endless, to complete his contract with Def Jam, and quickly followed up with Blonde the next day independently, both as Apple Music exclusives. The act of Frank Ocean leaving Def Jam called into question surprise albums and exclusive digital releases. An anonymous Def Jam employee said to Buzzfeed at the time, "Our view is that giving exclusives to individual streaming platforms for long periods of time is not good for the artist, it's not good for the fans, and it limits the commercial opportunity for everybody involved." By 2019, Vulture and The Music Network published editorial articles questioning if the surprise album release format had peaked in popularity and effectiveness.

In 2018, American rapper Eminem released his tenth studio album Kamikaze without any promotion or pre-announcement following the polarizing reaction of his previous 2017 album Revival, making it his second full-length studio album in 8 months. In a four-part video interview series with Sway Calloway, he laid out the reason for releasing the album this way. "When you go into an album, you can go into anything with the mindset of, 'This is gonna suck.' I feel like giving them no warning was the best thing to do. When the Revival track list came down the pipe, it was like overwhelmingly, 'This shit is going to be trash.' Nobody really wanted to be wrong about it. I'm not saying everybody, but a lot of people had already formed their opinion." Eminem's next studio album in 2020, Music to Be Murdered By (and the Side B – Deluxe Edition) was another surprise release. In an interview on his radio channel Shade 45, he explained the tendency of dropping surprise albums: "I feel like when an album is coming out, if I give people notice. They start seeing the track list and they know it's coming, I feel like, my best shot to avoid it is just to drop it, instead of people thinking to themselves like 'if he got this person on the album, I ain't f**king with it.' It gives everybody too much time to think about it and their expectations of what they think it should be, I will never meet that. So this is kind of theory I have based ever since Revival."

In 2020, American singer-songwriter Taylor Swift's eighth studio album, Folklore, was released with less than 24 hours' notice to much surprise among listeners and the music industry. The album was created in isolation during the COVID-19 pandemic, under total secrecy; Republic Records, Swift's record label, were informed about the project only a few hours before its launch. According to Elias Leight of Rolling Stone, while Swift had preferred traditional album-release cycles and was "a rare holdout" among major recording artists, Folklores surprise release acknowledged that "the new class of winners release music steadily and adapt quickly to capitalize on sudden flashpoints, rather than trying to force those flashpoints to happen on any sort of regular, preordained schedule. If music industry success used to be all about muscle, now it's more about speed." Five months later, Swift surprise-released her ninth studio album, Evermore, which she dubbed as Folklore's "sister" project. Vulture stated that the news of another surprise album from Swift "came as a major shock", as she has been "the industry's most prominent loyalist to the pop-album rollout", who turns her carefully planned releases into "an art of their own". In 2022, hours after the release of her tenth studio album, Midnights, Swift surprise-released seven additional songs written for but not included in the original 13-song track list.

Reception 
Rachel Finn of DIY said that while surprise albums were becoming too common to be truly surprising, "it gives artists breathing space to really make an impact and retain control over the way their music is released, pre-empting album leaks and taking their album out of the pre-album press cycle to let the music speak for itself." Entrepreneur and freelance writer Cortney Harding wrote in a Medium article that while surprise albums give artists more flexibility, the strategy can usually only pay off for well-known musicians and can be problematic when the album is exclusive to a specific streaming service. David Sackllah of Consequence of Sound noted that while many major artists had attempted a surprise release, few had matched or surpassed the level of excitement of In Rainbows. Writing for The Ringer, Lindsay Zoladz expressed criticism toward overuse of the term that began to dilute its meaning as music journalists were using "surprise album" to describe albums that were previously announced. Zoladz stated:

"'Surprise album' has become such a ubiquitous term that its meaning becomes more vague with each passing tweet. (Last month the Chicago Tribune even used it to describe Drake's Views, an album that not only had a previously announced release date, but which Drake himself had been teasing for the better part of two years.) But even when the phrase is used more precisely, it's becoming a bit hollow; we're living through a deluge of albums — even something as long promised as Rihanna's Anti — that lay claim to that trendy term 'surprise,' but have, like Lemonade, given us a lot of hints that they were coming."

See also 
 Album era
 Hidden track

References

Sources